The 85th Pennsylvania House of Representatives District is located in  central Pennsylvania and has been represented by David H. Rowe since 2019.

District profile
The 85th District encompasses part of Juniata County, Mifflin County, and Union County and all of Snyder County, and includes the following areas: 

Juniata County
Fayette Township
Monroe Township
Mifflin County
Burnham
Decatur Township
Derry Township
Snyder County

Union County
East Buffalo Township
 Union Township

Representatives

References

Government of Snyder County, Pennsylvania
Government of Union County, Pennsylvania
85